Heresie is the second album by Belgian RIO band Univers Zero released in 1979. (Reissued in 2010 as a remix with bonus track) It features heavy use of dissonance and dark, brooding and extremely complex melodies.

Its title is often written as Hérésie (because in lowercase heresie like a centuries-old version of the word, whereas in another edition of the album, the spelling HERESIE looks it follows a habit of dropping accents when using uppercase, even in today's French).

Track listing
 "La Faulx" (Daniel Denis) – 25:18
 "Jack the Ripper" (Daniel Denis, Roger Trigaux) – 13:29
 "Vous le saurez en temps voulu" (Roger Trigaux) – 12:56
 "Chaos hermétique" (Roger Trigaux) - 11:52 (bonus track included on the 2010 remaster, recorded in 1975)

"La Faulx" translates as "The Scythe", although it is using an archaic spelling from Middle French; "Vous le saurez en temps voulu" translates as "You'll Know It in Due Course"; "Chaos hermétique" translates as "Hermetic Chaos".

Personnel
 Roger Trigaux: guitar, piano, organ, harmonium
 Guy Segers: bass, voice
 Michel Berckmans: oboe, bassoon
 Patrick Hanappier: violin, viola
 Daniel Denis: drums, percussion

Production
 Produced By Eric Faes
 Engineered By Etienne Conod
 Mixed By Univers Zero & Etienne Conod
 Mastered By Roger Seibel
 Remixed and remastered by Didier de Roos (2010)

External links
Heresie. Heresie at Univers Zero's official homepage.

1979 albums
Univers Zero albums